List of local communities in Novi Sad:

References

Politics of Novi Sad